Ascute asconoides is a species of calcareous sponge found in Australia.

References

Sponges described in 1886
Sponges of Australia
Ascute